SD 101 or SD-101 may refer to :
 South Dakota Highway 101
 SD-101, a TLR9 agonist in clinical trials as an immunotherapy